In the Box was a 30-minute preschoolers' television program which aired in Australia on Network Ten at  to , from Monday to Friday. It first aired on 21 December 1998, with the series ending in 2006. It was most recently hosted by Brett Annable, Tracey Fleming, Michael McKenna and Bop, their resident puppet.

The show featured varied content. However, there were certain events that would take place during each episode. These included a 'delivery', in which the hosts received a box of items to do an activity with, a visit from two different children each day, and the goodbye song. Some episodes had a particular theme such as baking or time travel.

During each episode, Michael, Brett, Tracey and Bop sang a variety of songs which appealed to the young target audience. These included Simon Says, Follow the Leader and Washy Washy.

References

External links 
 

1998 Australian television series debuts
2006 Australian television series endings
Australian children's television series
Australian preschool education television series
Australian television series with live action and animation
Australian television shows featuring puppetry
English-language television shows
Network 10 original programming
Television shows set in Brisbane